The official discography of Living Colour, an American funk metal band.

Albums

Studio albums

Live albums

Compilation albums

Extended plays

†The Sony Music Japan edition of this disc had nine extra tracks not available on the international editions, making Biscuits a compilation album.

Singles

Video albums

Music videos

Other appearances

References

Discographies of American artists
Heavy metal group discographies
Funk music discographies